Tupadly may refer to places in the Czech Republic:

Tupadly (Kutná Hora District), a municipality and village in the Central Bohemian Region
Tupadly (Mělník District), a municipality and village in the Central Bohemian Region
Tupadly, a village and part of Klatovy in the Plzeň Region

See also
Tupadły (disambiguation)